The Neftchi Baku 2013–14 season was Neftchi Baku's 22nd Azerbaijan Premier League season, and their fourth season under manager Boyukagha Hajiyev. Neftchi are the defending champions of the Azerbaijan Premier League and will also compete in the 2013–14 Azerbaijan Cup.
They entered and were eliminated at the 2nd qualifying round of the UEFA Champions League by Skënderbeu Korçë of Albania.
Following their elimination from the Champions League, Boyukagha Hajiyev resigned on 25 July 2013, and was replaced by Tarlan Ahmadov. Ahmadov was sacked as manager on 23 October 2013 following Neftchi's 2–1 defeat to Khazar Lankaran in the Azerbaijan Supercup. Nazim Suleymanov was appointed the club's manager on 25 October, but resigned on 8 January 2014 following a dispute over transfer fund, and Boyukagha Hajiyev returning as manager on 11 January.

Squad 

 

 

 (captain)

Out on loan

Reserve squad 

(captain)

Transfers

Summer

In:

 

Out:

Winter

In:

 

 

 

Out:

The board of directors

Coaching staff

Competitions

Friendlies

Azerbaijan Supercup

Azerbaijan Premier League

Results summary

Results by round

Results

League table

Azerbaijan Cup

UEFA Champions League

Qualifying phase

Squad statistics

Appearances and goals

|-
|colspan="14"|Players away from Neftchi on loan:

|-
|colspan="14"|Players who appeared for Neftchi no longer at the club:

|}

Goal scorers

Disciplinary record

References

External links 
 Neftchi Baku at Soccerway.com

Neftchi Baku
Neftchi Baku
Neftçi PFK seasons